The 1892–93 Sheffield Shield season was the first season of the Sheffield Shield, the domestic first-class cricket competition of Australia. The competition took place between 16 December 1892 to 21 March 1893 and was contested by three teams. The competition was won by Victoria, who after defeating New South Wales at the Association Ground would go on to win all four of their matches. George Giffen scored the most runs in the competition with 468 runs while also taking the most wickets at 33 which included a nine wicket innings against Victoria in Adelaide.

Table

Notes:
 The order of the table was determined by the number of matches won by each team.

Pld: matches played; W: won; L: lost

Source:

Fixtures

Statistics

Most runs

Source:

High scores

Source:

Most wickets

Source:

Best bowling

Source:

References

External links
 Series home at ESPN Cricinfo

Sheffield Shield
Sheffield Shield
Sheffield Shield seasons